Rakut Sitelu is a kinship system of the Karo people of Indonesia. There are three titles in the rakut sitelu, namely kalimbubu, sembuyak or senina, and anak beru.

References

Karo people
Kinship and descent